
Last Summer or The Last Summer can refer to:

Books
The Last Summer (of You and Me), a novel by Ann Brashares
Last Summer, a novel by Evan Hunter
The Last Summer (novella), by Boris Pasternak
The Last Summer, a novel by Iain Crichton Smith

Films
The Last Summer (1954 film), a 1954 West German drama film
Last Summer, a 1969 American drama film
Last Summer (2021 film), a Turkish romantic drama film
The Last Summer (1974 film), a 1974 Bulgarian drama film
The Last Summer (2019 film), a 2019 American romantic comedy film

Music
"I Somras (Last Summer)", Swedish-language suite by Wilhelm Peterson-Berger (1867–1942)

Albums
Last Summer (album), an album by Eleanor Friedberger
The Last Summer, album by LO-FI-FNK
The Last Summer, 2019 album by R Plus (Rollo Armstrong)
The Last Summer, an alternative name for Live: The Last Summer, album by the Siegel–Schwall Band

Songs
"Last Summer" (song), a song by Lostprophets
"Last Summer", song by David Gray from Mutineers
"Last Summer", song by Rod Stewart from Blondes Have More Fun